Michael Hobert is an American actor. He had a recurring role on the TV show Scrubs as Lonnie. His brother, Tim Hobert, was one of the show's producers. Hobert has also appeared in Spin City and Gilmore Girls. He wrote a movie with Sam Jaeger called Advantage Hart. Hobert was originally in the first episode of Scrubs, "My First Day", as "Pizza Delivery Guy", who was the guy in the MRI machine.

Filmography

Acting

Film

Television

Writing

Television

External links

Year of birth missing (living people)
Living people
American male television actors